Debbie White is a New Zealand international lawn bowler.

Bowls career
White became National champion in 2019 when winning the singles at the New Zealand National Bowls Championships.

In 2020 she was selected for the 2020 World Outdoor Bowls Championship in Australia.

Personal life
Her mother Jennie Simpson was an international bowler, Commonwealth Games medallist and National champion.

References

New Zealand female bowls players
Living people
Year of birth missing (living people)